{{Drugbox
| drug_name = ortho-Iodohippuric acid
| Watchedfields = 
| verifiedrevid = 
| IUPAC_name = 2-[(2-Iodobenzoyl)amino]acetic acid
| image = Ortho-Iodohippuric acid.svg
| width = 243

| tradename =  
| pregnancy_AU = 
| pregnancy_US = 
| pregnancy_category =  
| legal_AU = 
| legal_CA = 
| legal_UK = 
| legal_US = 
| legal_status =  
| routes_of_administration = intravenous

| bioavailability =  
| protein_bound =  
| metabolism =  
| elimination_half-life =  
| excretion = renal

| IUPHAR_ligand = 
| CAS_number_Ref = 
| CAS_number = 147-58-0
| CAS_supplemental = 
| ATC_prefix = 
| ATC_suffix = 
| PubChem = 8614
| DrugBank_Ref = 
| DrugBank = 
| ChemSpiderID_Ref = 
| ChemSpiderID = 8295 
| UNII_Ref = 
| UNII = 3Y68K91A3M
| KEGG_Ref = 
| KEGG = 
| ChEBI_Ref = 
| ChEBI = 
| ChEMBL_Ref = 
| ChEMBL = 
| NIAID_ChemDB = 

| C=9 | H=8
| N=1 | O=3
| I=1
| smiles = C1=CC=C(C(=C1)C(=O)NCC(=O)O)I
| StdInChI = 1S/C9H8INO3/c10-7-4-2-1-3-6(7)9(14)11-5-8(12)13/h1-4H,5H2,(H,11,14)(H,12,13)
| StdInChIKey = CORFWQGVBFFZHF-UHFFFAOYSA-N
| synonyms = Iodohippuric acid, I Hippuran, I OIH, I-Hippuran, I-OIH, Iodobenzoylglycine, Sodium iodohippurate, Sodium o-iodohippurate, ortho Iodohippurate, ortho-Iodohippurate, Orthoiodohippurate, Radio Hippuran, Radio-Hippuran, RadioHippuran, Sodium Iodohippurate 
}}ortho-Iodohippuric acid (ortho''-iodohippurate, OIH''') is an analog of p-aminohippuric acid for the determination of effective renal plasma flow. Labelled OIH has a significantly higher clearance than other radiopharmaceutical yet developed and is eminently suitable for renography. It is eliminated mainly by tubular secretion. In patients with normally functioning kidneys, 85% of the OIH may be found in the urine 30 minutes after intravenous injection.

OIH was first labelled with 131I by Tubis and colleagues (Tubis, Posnick and Nordyke in 1960) and for many years this was the only radiopharmaceutical for renography. 131I has a half-life of 8 days and emits high-energy γ rays (364 keV) in addition to β particles. These physical characteristics were acceptable for probe studies when quantities of the order 1-2 MBq (25-50 μCi) were administered, but they are far from ideal for γ-camera studies which demand a higher activity and a γ ray emission of lower energy. The introduction of OIH labelled with 123I, with its short physical half-life (13 hours) and its gamma emission of 159 keV has greatly improved the diagnostic potential of renal studies by combining the production of high-quality functional images with the ability to derive a renogram. The only factor limiting its widespread use is restricted availability and the expense involved in its cyclotron production.

References

Benzamides
Acetic acids
Iodoarenes